The 1954–55 Greenlandic Football Championship (also known as the  Grønlandturneringen, Fodboldmesterskab i Grønland or ) was the 1st edition of the Greenlandic Men's Football Championship. The final round was held in Ilulissat. It was won by Nuuk Idraetslag who defeated Nagdlunguaq-48 in the final.

Background
The first federation to organise a national football championship in Greenland was the GIF, a general sports federation that organised more than just football tournaments, founded on 3 September 1953 at a meeting attended by eleven clubs from Upernavik, Uummannaq, Qeqertarsuatsiaat, Qasigiannguit, Aasiaat, Sisimiut, Maniitsoq, Nuuk, Paamiut and Qaqortoq. The 1954–55 tournament was the first national football tournament and GIF continued to organise the competition, usually announced as Fodboldturneringen, Grønlandturneringen or Fodboldmesterskab i Grønland, until 1970. For the first decade of its existence, the tournament was held sporadically, with iterations often taking more than a year to complete. In 1971 a football specific federation, the Football Association of Greenland (Greenlandic: Kalaallit Nunaanni Isikkamik Arsaattartut Kattuffiat), was founded, and took over the organisation of the tournament.

Competing teams

In total, 22 clubs registered for the tournament who were usually denoted by their home towns in newspaper reports rather than their club name. However, the two finalists were definitely the club sides Nuuk Idraetslag and Nagdlunguaq-48. Known participants are listed below:

 Aassik-43, Narsaq
 Kissaviarsuk-33, Qaqortoq
 Nagdlunguaq-48, Ilulissat
 Nanok, Qullissat
 Nuuk Idraetslag, Nuuk
 Siumut Amerdlok Kunuk, Sisimiut
 Tupilak-41, Aasiaat

Possible participants:

 Akavsak, Aamaruutissat
 KSP, Qeqertarsuatsiaat

N.B.: On 19 April 1954, Akavsak, from the town of Aamaruutissat, which was abandoned in 1965 played KSP from Qeqertarsuatsiaat. It is not clear whether that match was part of the tournament. Additionally, on 8 April 1955 a team from Qullissat (presumably Nanok) won 4–1 against a team from Aamaruutissat (presumably Âkavsak). Again, it is not clear whether that match was part of the tournament.

Format
The competitions was divided into two sections, a north section, known to have been played as a single group and a southern section, known to have been divided into two groups. The top two teams in each group in the southern section played each other with the winners qualifying for a regional final to determine the entrant to the grand final. The northern section also featured at least two knockout rounds to determine their entrant. The final was played as a one off match.

Recorded results

Pulje I/II (Sydkredsen)

Pulje III (Nordkredsen)

Final

References

Greenlandic Men's Football Championship seasons
Green
Foot
Foot